The 1999 UAB Blazers football team represented the University of Alabama at Birmingham (UAB) in the college football season of 1999, and was the ninth team fielded by the school. The Blazers' head coach was Watson Brown, who entered his fifth season as UAB's head coach. They played their home games at Legion Field in Birmingham, Alabama, and competed as a member of Conference USA. The Blazers finished their fourth season at the I-A level, and their first affiliated with a conference with a record of 5–6 (4–2 C-USA).

Schedule

References

UAB
UAB Blazers football seasons
UAB Blazers football